Grodecki (feminine: Grodecka; plural: Grodeccy) is a Polish surname. It may refer to:

 Adrian Grodecki, Polish bishop
 Louis Grodecki (1910–1982), French art historian
 Roman Grodecki (1889–1964), Polish economic historian
 Wiktor Grodecki (born 1960), Polish filmmaker

See also
 

Polish-language surnames